"409" is a song written by Brian Wilson, Mike Love, and Gary Usher for the American rock and roll band the Beach Boys. The song features Love singing lead vocals. It was originally released as the B-side of the single "Surfin' Safari" (1962). It was later released on their 1962 album Surfin' Safari, and appeared again on their 1963 album Little Deuce Coupe.

The song is credited for initiating the hot rod music craze of the 1960s.

Composition

"409" was inspired by Gary Usher's obsession with hot rods. Its title refers to an automobile fitted with Chevrolet's 409-cubic-inch-displacement "big block" V8 engine. The song's narrator concludes with the description "My four speed, dual-quad, positraction four-oh-nine." This version of the engine - at 409 hp, achieving 1 hp per cubic inch - featured twin "D" series Carter AFB (Aluminum Four Barrel) carburetors ("dual-quads"). It was offered in new vehicles (Impala SS ["Super Sport"]; Bel Air; Biscayne) and as replacement units in the 1962 model year.

It stayed one week on the Billboard Hot 100, at number 76, in October 1962.

Personnel
Mike Love – lead vocals
David Marks – rhythm guitar, background vocals
Brian Wilson – bass guitar, background vocals car sound effects tape
Carl Wilson – lead guitar, background vocals
Dennis Wilson – drums, background vocals

References

1962 singles
The Beach Boys songs
Songs written by Brian Wilson
Songs written by Mike Love
Songs written by Gary Usher
Songs about cars
Song recordings produced by Murry Wilson
1962 songs
Capitol Records singles